Meet Me in Montenegro is a romantic comedy film written and  directed by Alex Holdridge and Linnea Saasen.  It had its premiere at the Toronto International Film Festival in September 2014.

The film was distributed by The Orchard and had its North American Theatrical release in Summer 2015; it was launched at festivals across Europe throughout 2015, including the Edinburgh International Film Festival, Munich Film Film Festival, Dublin International Film Festival, Kraków's Off Camera International Festival of Independent Cinema and Tromsø International Film Festival.  The film stars Alex Holdridge, Linnea Saasen, Rupert Friend and Jennifer Ulrich.

Principal cast 
 Rupert Friend as Stephen
 Jennifer Ulrich as Federieke
 Alex Holdridge as Anderson
 Linnea Saasen as Lina

With supporting cast including:
 Stuart Manashil as Sam
 Ben Braun as Patrick
 Mia Jacob as Katherine 
 Deborah Ann Woll as Wendy
 Lena Ehlers as Pregnant co-worker

Production 
The film was shot in Berlin, Los Angeles, London, Montenegro, and Macedonia. Shooting in each country ran between November 2011 to March 2015. Post Production was done in Berlin.

References

External links 
 

2014 films
English-language German films
English-language Norwegian films
English-language Montenegrin films
2010s German-language films
2014 romantic comedy films
Films shot in Berlin
Films shot in Los Angeles
Films shot in Montenegro
Films set in Montenegro
Films directed by Alex Holdridge
The Orchard (company) films
German romantic comedy films
2010s English-language films
2010s German films